Didin Taresoh (born 3 June 1975) is a Malaysian para-badminton player. He has a career-high ranking of 6 in the in para-badminton men's singles SH6 classification.

Career 
He won a gold medal in the 2015 BWF Para-Badminton World Championships in the SH6 classification, which is his best achievement in his career to date. In the next two editions of the World Championships, he won two consecutive bronze medals, in both men's singles and mixed doubles respectively.

He also won gold at the 2017 ASEAN Para Games, defeating compatriot Muhammad Naim Ahmad Halmi.

He also participated in the 2018 Asian Para Games in Jakarta, Indonesia and won a silver medal. 

These achievements earned him a spot in the Paralympics. He debuted in the 2020 Summer Paralympics in Tokyo, the same edition where badminton as introduced into the games. However, his run for a Paralympic medal was later cut short after failing to get past the group stage.

Achievements

World Championships 
Men's singles

Mixed doubles

Asian Para Games 
Men's singles

Asian Championships 
Men's singles

ASEAN Para Games 
Men's singles

International Tournaments (1 title, 2 runners-up) 
Men's singles

Singles

References

1975 births
Living people
People from Sabah
Paralympic badminton players of Malaysia
Badminton players at the 2020 Summer Paralympics
Malaysian male badminton players
Malaysian para-badminton players